The Years is a 2008 autobiographical novel by Annie Ernaux.

Synopsis
In the book, Ernaux writes about herself in the third person (elle, or "she" in English) for the first time, providing a vivid look at French society just after the Second World War until the early 2000s. It is the moving social story of a woman and of the evolving society she lived in. With this feature of book, Edmund White described it as a "collective autobiography", in his review for The New York Times.

Reception
The Years was very well received by French critics and is considered by many to be her magnum opus.

It won the 2008 Françoise-Mauriac Prize of the Académie française, the 2008 Marguerite Duras Prize, the 2008 French Language Prize, the 2009 Télégramme Readers Prize, and the 2016 Premio Strega Europeo Prize. Translated by Alison L. Strayer, The Years was a Finalist for the 31st Annual French-American Foundation Translation Prize. 

Alison L. Strayer's English translation was shortlisted for the International Booker Prize in 2019.

References

2008 French novels
French autobiographical novels
Novels by Annie Ernaux
Novels set in Normandy